PADS may refer to:

PADS (CAD software), family of software tools, see Mentor Graphics
Pads, sports protective equipment

See also

 
 PAD (disambiguation)
 Pad (disambiguation)